Whooeeee (also released as Today's Jazz and Morning Fun) is an album by the Zoot Sims-Bob Brookmeyer Quintet recorded in 1956 for the Storyville label.

Reception

The Allmusic review by Scott Yanow stated: "Sims and Brookmeyer are in fine form".

Track listing
All compositions by Bob Brookmeyer except where noted.
 "The King" (Count Basie) – 4:44
 "Lullaby of the Leaves" (Bernice Petkere, Joe Young) – 5:16
 "I Can't Get Started" (Vernon Duke, Ira Gershwin) – 4:40
 "Snake Eyes" – 4:03
 "Morning Fun" (Zoot Sims) – 5:07
 "Whooeeee" – 5:10
 "Someone to Watch Over Me/My Old Flame" (George Gershwin, Ira Gershwin/Sam Coslow, Arthur Johnston) – 4:16
 "Box Cars" (Al Cohn) – 5:24

Personnel 
Zoot Sims – tenor saxophone, vocals
Bob Brookmeyer – valve trombone
Hank Jones – piano
Bill Crow – bass
Jo Jones – drums

References 

1956 albums
Storyville Records (George Wein's) albums
Bob Brookmeyer albums
Zoot Sims albums